Kiwa or KIWA may refer to:

 Kiwa, Mie, Japan
 Kiwa (electronic music act), Finland
 Kiwa NV a European institution for Testing and Certification
 Kiwa (artist) (real name Jaanus Kivaste; born 1975), Estonian artist
 Kiwa (mythology), a guardian of the sea in Māori tradition
 Kiwa (crustacean), a genus of deep-sea crustaceans
 Koreatown Immigrant Workers Alliance, an immigrant worker organization in Los Angeles, United States
 the ICAO airport code for Phoenix-Mesa Gateway Airport in Mesa, Arizona
 KIWA (AM), a radio station (1550 AM) licensed to Sheldon, Iowa, United States
 KIWA-FM, a radio station (105.3 FM) licensed to Sheldon, Iowa, United States

People with the surname
Teiko Kiwa (1902-1983), Japanese-Dutch opera singer